Idalus lineosus is a moth of the family Erebidae. It was described by Francis Walker in 1869. It is found in French Guiana, Brazil, Colombia, Ecuador, Peru, Bolivia, Costa Rica and Honduras.

References

 

lineosus
Moths described in 1869